Kobie Rhys Literal Brown (born 12 October 2003) is a Filipino-British actor, singer, and television personality. He came to prominence in 2020  when he joined Pinoy Big Brother: Connect, where he was dubbed as "Charming Striker ng Parañaque" and was placed as the 3rd Big Placer.  He has since appeared in various films and television series, such as Saying Goodbye (2021), Love In 40 Days (2022), Connected (2022) and The Entitled (2022) alongside his love team partner Andi Abaya.

Early life and career 
Brown was born on October 12, 2003, to a British dad, Andy Brown and Filipino mother, Maita Literal. He has 2 siblings, Khalil and Amaia. He attended Southville International School. He enjoys playing football.

In May 2021, Kobie was introduced as part of Dreamscape Entertainment's The Squad Plus.

Later that year, he was cast together with Abaya in iQiYi's first Filipino local original Saying Goodbye which premiered in December 2021. Also in the series Love in 40 Days, which premiered in May 2022 and in the Netflix film The Entitled, which premiered in July 2022.

In June 2022, Star Magic Studios released its first ever produced film, "Connected" with Abaya and other Pinoy Big Brother: Connect ex-housemates.

Filmography

Film

Television/Digital

References

Living people
2003 births
Pinoy Big Brother contestants
Star Magic
21st-century Filipino male actors
Filipino male film actors
Filipino male television actors